Goddess of Marriage is a 2013 South Korean romantic comedy-drama series starring Nam Sang-mi, Kim Ji-hoon, Lee Sang-woo, Lee Tae-ran, Kim Jung-tae, Jo Min-su, Kwon Hae-hyo, Jang Young-nam and Jang Hyun-sung. It premiered on SBS on June 29, 2013, and ended on November 3, 2013, airing every Saturday and Sunday at 21:50 for 36 episodes.

Plot
The drama explores modern love, careerwomanhood, and the meaning of marriage as experienced by four couples.

Cast
Nam Sang-mi as Song Ji-hye
A radio writer who's assertive, but dreams of a sweet, pure love. She becomes caught in a love triangle between two men, which makes her question the romantic ideal versus the reality of marriage.
Lee Sang-woo as Kim Hyun-woo
An architect. He suddenly appears in Ji-hye's life and seems to be her soulmate.
Kim Ji-hoon as Kang Tae-wook
A prosecutor from a wealthy family. Ji-hye's longtime boyfriend.
Lee Tae-ran as Hong Hye-jung
She used to work as a television announcer, and is now a mother of two and a "Cheongdam-dong daughter-in-law" (a stylish young married women of the upper crust living in that wealthy neighborhood).
Kim Jung-tae as Kang Tae-jin
Married to Hye-jung. Tae-wook's older brother.
Jo Min-su as Song Ji-sun
A "Supermom" who works while raising three children. Ji-hye's older sister.
Kwon Hae-hyo as Noh Jang-soo
He and Ji-sun got married when he got her pregnant. Jang-soo is a kind and meek husband who is overpowered by his wife's strong energy and can't raise his voice.
Jang Young-nam as Kwon Eun-hee
She tries so hard to meet her husband's exacting standards on what constitutes a "good wife."
Jang Hyun-sung as Noh Seung-soo
Married to Eun-hee. He is having an affair with his colleague Cynthia.
Jeon Guk-hwan as Kang Man-ho
Tae-wook and Tae-jin's father.
Yoon So-jung as Lee Jung-sook
Tae-wook and Tae-jin's mother.
Baek Il-seob as Song Nam-gil
Ji-hye and Ji-sun's father.
Kim Ki-chun as Noh Hee-bong
Jang-soo's father.
Sung Byung-sook as Byun Ae-ja
Jang-soo's mother.
Kim Mi-kyung as Hyun-woo's mother
Yeon Woon-kyung as Hye-jung's mother
Lee Se-young as Noh Min-jung
Ji-sun and Jang-soo's daughter.
Yang Han-yeol as Noh Chang-ho
Eun-hee's son
Kim Joon-goo as Kim Ye-sol
Shim Yi-young as Nam Mi-ra
She seduces Tae-jin.
Park Wan-kyu as Jung Dae-hyun
Yeon-soo's husband.
Lee Seol-hee as Kim Yeon-soo
Ji-hye's friend.
Clara Lee as Cynthia Jung
Anchorwoman of KoreaTV, and Seung-soo's lover.
Yeom Dong-heon as Managing director Hwang
Go Na-eun as Han Se-kyung
Park Joon-geum as Han Se-kyeong's mother
Jo Woo-jin as the husband of Hye-jung's younger sister
Kwak Hee-sung as Pil-ho

Ratings 
In the tables below, the blue numbers represent the lowest ratings and the red numbers represent the highest ratings.

Awards and nominations

References

External links
  
 

2013 South Korean television series debuts
2013 South Korean television series endings
Seoul Broadcasting System television dramas
Korean-language television shows
South Korean romantic comedy television series
Television series by Samhwa Networks